Asenby is a village and civil parish in the Harrogate district of North Yorkshire, England, with a population of 285 (2001 census), increasing to 311 at the 2011 census.

History
The village is mentioned in the Domesday Book as Estanebi in the Yarlestre hundred. It was part of the manor of Topcliffe at the time of the Norman invasion and followed the descent of that manor thereafter.

The toponymy of the village name is the combination of the Norse personal name of Eystein and bi giving the meaning of Eystein's farm.

Governance
The village lies within the Skipton and Ripon UK Parliament constituency. It is also within the Wathvale ward of Harrogate Borough District Council and the Mashams and Fountains electoral division of North Yorkshire County Council. The local Parish Council has five members.

Geography
The village lies on the south bank of the River Swale and wedged in between the A168 and A167 roads. The majority of the surrounding land in the parish is given to farming.

Culture and community
The village is mostly housing with one public house on the outskirts. There is no church in the parish.

Demography

Population

2001 Census
Of the total population, 97.5% declared themselves as White/British with the rest being White/Other. The gender split was 50.8% male to 49.2% female. The declaration of religious belief was 77.9% Christian, 20.7% No religion/Not stated and 1% Jewish and 1% Other. There were 128 dwellings.

2011 Census
Of the total population, 97.1% declared themselves as White/British with 1.6% being White/Other. The rest were made of 0.6% mixed White/Asian, 0.3% White/Irish and 0.1% British Asian. The gender split was 51.4% male to 48.6% female. The declaration of religious belief was 72.7% Christian, 25.7% No religion/Not stated and 1.6% Buddhist. There were 130 dwellings.

Notable people
 Mary Bateman (also known as the Yorkshire Witch) was born in the village.

References

External links
 

Villages in North Yorkshire
Civil parishes in North Yorkshire